Trixiphichthys weberi, the blacktip tripodfish, is a species in the  tripod fish family (Triacanthidae) native to the tropical Indian and western Pacific Oceans.  It is of minor commercial importance to local fisheries.  This species grows to a length of  TL.  This species is the only known member of its genus.

References

Tetraodontiformes
Taxa named by Alec Fraser-Brunner
Monotypic marine fish genera